Tomislav Ćiraković (born 10 October 1984) is a Montenegrin retired footballer who last played for FK Čelik Nikšić.

Club career
He also used to play for OFK Igalo, FK Čelik, before joining Sutjeska to play in the First League of Serbia and Montenegro during the 2004–05 season.

References

1984 births
Living people
People from Kotor
Association football midfielders
Serbia and Montenegro footballers
Montenegrin footballers
FK Sutjeska Nikšić players
FK Igalo 1929 players
FK Čelik Nikšić players
First League of Serbia and Montenegro players
Second League of Serbia and Montenegro players
Montenegrin First League players
Montenegrin Second League players